Anand District is an administrative district of Gujarat state in western India and whose popular nickname is Charotar.  It was carved out of the Kheda district in 1997. Anand is the administrative headquarters of the district. It is bounded by Kheda District to the north, Vadodara District to the east, Ahmedabad District to the west, and the Gulf of Khambhat to the south. Major towns are Umreth, Khambhat, Karamsad, Tarapur, Petlad, Borsad and Sojitra.

Demographics

According to the 2011 census, Anand district has a population of 2,092,745 (With total Males 1,088,253 and total Females 1,002,023), roughly equal to the nation of North Macedonia or the US state of New Mexico. This gives it a ranking of 219th in India (out of a total of 640). Its population growth rate over the decade 2001-2011 was 12.57%. Anand has a sex ratio of 921 females for every 1000 males, and a literacy rate of 85.79% (Males 93.23% and females 77.76%). 30.34% of the population lived in urban areas. Scheduled Castes and Scheduled Tribes made up 4.99% and 1.19% of the population respectively.

At the time of the 2011 Census of India, 96.67% of the population in the district spoke Gujarati and 2.10% Hindi as their first language.

Talukas
Anand District is administratively divided into eight talukas or subdistricts: Anand, Anklav, Borsad, Khambhat, Petlad, Sojitra, Tarapur, and Umreth.

Politics
  

|}

Points of interest

 Anand City - birthplace of Tribhuvandas Patel, Founder of Anand Milk Union Limited and Cooperative movement, Milk City.
 Amul - Origin of Operation Flood, the White Revolution of India
 National Dairy Development Board - Headquarters
 Institute of Rural Management Anand
 Anand Agricultural University
 Sardar Patel University- Located in Vallabh Vidyanagar in Anand District.
 Karamsad - Native place of Sardar Patel.
 Khambhat - A historic and ancient port in the bay of Khambhat, known for its trade with foreign countries.
 Bhadran - was given nickname "Paris of Gaekwad state" due to its prosperity and civil works carried by Maharaja Sayajirao Gaekwad III about one century ago.
 Umreth - Heritage City for Jainism 
 Vadtal

See also
Bhurakoi
Finav
Ode, Gujarat
Kaniya,gujarat

References

External links 

 Official website

 
Populated places established in 1997
Districts of Gujarat
1997 establishments in Gujarat